The Río Orinoco spinetail (Synallaxis beverlyae) is a species of bird in the family Furnariidae. It is found from river island scrub in the lower and middle sections of the main channel of the Río Orinoco in Venezuela and adjacent Colombia.

References

 Hilty, S.L. & Ascanio, D. 2009. A new species of spinetail (Furnariidae: Synallaxis) from the Río Orinoco of Venezuela. Auk 126: 485−492.

External links
 SACC Proposal 406 - Recognize newly described Synallaxis beverlyae Hilty and Ascanio, 2009

Río Orinoco spinetail
Birds of Venezuela
Río Orinoco spinetail
Río Orinoco spinetail
Río Orinoco spinetail